The 2010–11 Liga Gimel season saw 92 clubs competing in 6 regional divisions for promotion to Liga Bet.

F.C. Bu'eine (Upper Galilee), F.C. Daburiyya (Jezreel), Hapoel Baqa al-Gharbiyye (Samaria), F.C. Tira (Sharon), Gadna Tel Aviv (Tel Aviv) and Maccabi Be'er Ya'akov (Central) all won their respective divisions and were promoted to Liga Bet.

During the summer, as several vacancies were created in Liga Bet, runners-up F.C. Bnei Arraba (Upper Galilee), Maccabi Ein Mahil (Jezreel) and Hapoel Hod HaSharon (Sharon) were also promoted to Liga Bet.

Upper Galilee Division

During the season, Hapoel Halat al-Sharif Tamra, Maccabi Bnei Nahf (both after 1 match) and Maccabi Sha'ab (after 8 matches) folded and their results were annulled.

Jezreel Division

Samaria Division

Sharon Division

Tel Aviv Division

Central Division

During the season, Maccabi Segev Shalom (after 3 matches) folded and its results were annulled.

References
Liga Gimel Upper Galilee The Israel Football Association (via archive.org) 
Liga Gimel Jezreel The Israel Football Association 
Liga Gimel Samaria The Israel Football Association 
Liga Gimel Sharon The Israel Football Association 
Liga Gimel Tel Aviv The Israel Football Association 
Liga Gimel Central The Israel Football Association 

Liga Gimel seasons
5
Israel